Zak Skinner (born 16 October 1998) is a British Paralympic athlete, who competes in the 100m and long jump in the T13 classification.

Early career 
Skinner grew up in Tonbridge and Malling. He was born completely blind before regaining some sight at the age of two. He is coached by Aston Moore.

Skinner's first accolades came in 2016, winning gold medals in the IPC England 100m, 200m and long jump in the age-groups categories, and winning gold and bronze in the senior long jump and 400m, respectively.

In 2017, Skinner came 4th in the T13 long jump at the World Para Athletics Championships in London. He followed this success with a silver medal in the long jump, and 4th place in the 100m, at the 2018 European Para Championships.

In 2021, Skinner took his first gold medal on the international stage, winning the 100m at the World Para Athletics Championships in Bydgoczcz. He was subsequently selected to represent Team GB at the 2020 Tokyo Paralympics, in the T13 long jump and 100m.

Personal life 
Skinner has ocular albinism, a genetic condition that affects vision. He is the son of former England rugby player Mickey Skinner. Away from athletics, Skinner is a DJ.

References 

People with albinism
1998 births
People from Tonbridge and Malling (district)
British male long jumpers
Living people
Athletes (track and field) at the 2020 Summer Paralympics